San Vicente de Chucurí is a town and municipality in the Santander Department in northeastern Colombia. Famous for its cocoa, San Vicente was embroiled in the armed conflict of the 1980s.

References

External links
 Official web site

Municipalities of Santander Department